Silver plan may refer to:
 An offering of the United States' Patient Protection and Affordable Care Act defined as covering 70 percent of out-of-pocket costs
 That offering as qualifying a household for cost-sharing subsidies under Affordable Care Act tax provisions
 That offering as basis for calculation of a premium tax credit
 A proposed offering of the un-passed 2009 House Bill 3962, known as the Affordable Health Care for America Act
 A digital phone plan by Full Channel
 A meal plan offered by the College of Saint Rose
 An affiliation level launched in May 2009 by  NBCUniversal Television Group